Chenango Forks is a hamlet located in Broome County, New York,  United States. The community is situated partly in the town of Chenango and partly in the town of Barker.

Chenango Valley State Park is southwest of the hamlet. Chenango Forks is a few miles from the border of Chenango County. 

Chenango Forks is part of the Greater Binghamton Metropolitan Statistical Area.

The Chenango Canal Prism and Lock 107 was listed on the National Register of Historic Places in 2010.

References

Hamlets in New York (state)
Binghamton metropolitan area
Hamlets in Broome County, New York